The 1992 Tour of Britain was the sixth edition of the Kellogg's Tour of Britain cycle race and was held from 10 August to 14 August 1992. The race started in Dundee and finished in Leeds. The race was won by Max Sciandri of the Motorola team.

Route

General classification

References

1992
Tour of Britain
Tour of Britain
August 1992 sports events in the United Kingdom